Delhi Gadhakal (Tales from Delhi) is a Malayalam language novel by M. Mukundan. It was first published as a book by D. C. Books in November 2011. The novel portrays the various events that greatly influenced the author's life during the 40 years spent in New Delhi, since 1962. The novel has as protagonist a leftist Kerala youth, named Sahadevan, who had the shock of his life when he landed in Delhi to hear the news of Chinese attack on India. It was translated from Malayalam by Fathima E. V. and Nandakumar K. under the title Delhi: A Soliloquy.

It took three years for Mukundan to finish the novel. It was released on 1 November 2011. The novel received much critical praise and soon went on to become one of the best-selling novels of the year. It also won several awards including the first Kamala Suraiyya Award.

Background
Delhi Gadhakal has been penned in the backdrop of New Delhi, the city to which the author's name has been associated probably even more than his hometown, Mayyazhi (Mahe). The novel was inspired by various events that greatly influenced the author's life during the 40 years spent in New Delhi, since 1962. Mukundan had traveled to Delhi in 1962, as a young man, in search of a job, and over the next four decades, while working in the French Embassy, he has observed how the city has been transformed from a small village to a megapolis.

The novel begins with the Sino-Indian War. Mukundan says, "That war was a historical jolt for the Left movement in India. The Left was counting so much on China and its Premier, Zhou Enlai. In fact, in the Kerala of those days, we talked more about Zhou, rather than Mahatma Gandhi and Pandit Nehru." In the novel, Mukundan also describes the impact of the 1965 and 1971 wars against Pakistan on the people of Delhi. But the most important section is on the 1975 Emergency which was imposed by Prime Minister Indira Gandhi. The novel also describes in detail the assassination of Indira Gandhi in 1984 and the subsequent anti-Sikh riots.

Plot summary
The novel narrates a story set in Delhi through the eyes of a Malayali youth, named Sahadevan, who lands in the capital after securing a job in a travel agency. On his arrival in the capital, carrying high hopes and aspirations, Sahadevan is welcomed by a shocker when he learns that China had attacked India. It was a historical jolt for the Left movement. This along with his first sight of old Delhi, which in those days looked like an ordinary village with plenty of wheat and cauliflower fields forms the first chapters of the novel. In the following chapters, several historical incidents such as Indo-Pak Wars of 1965 and 1971, The 1975 Emergency, assassination of Indira Gandhi and the subsequent anti-Sikh riots, and their impact on the people of Delhi have been tellingly narrated. The novel ends with a dream sequence in which a dying Sahadevan sees hundred thousands of beggars storm the Parliament.

Characters
 Sahadevan - the protagonist.
 Sreedharanunni - A third-grade employee in the Parliament. It is Sreedharanunni who brings Sahadevan to Delhi.
 Devi - Sreedharanunni's wife.
 Sathyanathan - Sreedharanunni's son. 
 Vidya - Sreedharanunni's daughter.
 Kunhikrishnan - A journalist working in Delhi.
 Lalita -  Kunhikrishnan's wife.
 Vasavappanicker - An artist working in Delhi.
 Rosily - A Malayalee Christian woman who is forced to become a prostitute in Delhi.
 Kunhikkannan Master - A naxalist leader in Kerala.
 Janakikutty - Kunhikkannan Master's daughter.
 Uttam Singh - Sahadevan's house owner at Amrit Puri.
 Pinki - Singh's younger daughter.
 Jaswinder - Singh's elder daughter.
 Dasappan - A barber working in Delhi.
 Gulshan Wadhwa - Sahadevan's employer.
 Om Prakash Jain - Sahadevan's house owner at Jangpura.
 Ashok Chimber - Sahadevan's house owner at Malviya Nagar.
 Kuber Lal - Sahadevan's house owner at Mayur Vihar.
 Harilal Shukla - An art lover and Vasavappanicker's mentor.
 Vanaja - Sahadevan's sister.
 Shyamala - Sahadevan's sister.
 Abdul Abdunnissar - Vanaja's lover.
 Abdul Aleem - Sahadevan's employee.
 Divakaran Potti - Sahadevan's employee.
 Seetharam - the dhobi. He is a victim of forced-sterilisation during the Emergency.
 Jamaludheen - a Bangladeshi refugee.

Writing
Delhi Gadhakal is M. Mukundan's 18th published work. The novelist has been highly successful with his earlier novel Delhi which had rewritten the conventional nuances of Malayalam novels by deviating from the then existing genre. Later, he had also penned a short-story on Delhi titled "Delhi1981". But the writer says that his latest work in no way should be treated a sequel to the earlier Delhi. According to the author, this novel is different from his other novels both thematically and in the style of narration. It took three years for Mukundan to finish the novel. He says that the idea of painting Delhi in such a huge canvas has always been in his mind, and he spent most of the time back in Delhi to pen the novel after completing his five-year term as the office-bearer of the Kerala Sahithya Akademi.

Release
The novel was released by former Kerala education minister M. A. Baby on 1 November 2011, at a cultural festival organised in connection with the 13th DC International Book Fair. In the event, Baby lauded the writer for his efforts to explore and recreate the mindset of the people during the Emergency and ‘their view of Indira Gandhi's misjudgement about people's power.'

Awards
2012: Kamala Suraiyya Award 
2012: VVK Award 
2021: JCB Prize for Literature

References

External links
 

2011 Indian novels
Malayalam novels
Novels by M. Mukundan
Novels set in Delhi
DC Books books